Layers of Live is a live album by Darkane. The title of this release is a reference to Layers of Lies.

Track listing

Other Material
 A 40 min "in the studio" documentary.
 A 45 min "on the road" documentary.

Credits
Darkane
Peter Wildoer - drums
Christofer Malmström - lead guitar
Klas Ideberg - rhythm guitar
Jörgen Löfberg - bass guitar
Andreas Sydow - vocals

References

2010 live albums
Darkane albums